The Addams Family: Pugsley's Scavenger Hunt is a platform game released by Ocean in 1992 in Europe and 1993 in North America. It is based on the 1992 animated series. It was released in North America for the Super Nintendo Entertainment System in February 1993, Game Boy in July 1993, and the Nintendo Entertainment System in August 1993.

The Game Boy version was ported by Enigma Variations.

Plot
The plot of Pugsley's Scavenger Hunt centered on Pugsley's attempts to win a scavenger hunt challenge proposed by his sister, Wednesday. His hunt takes him to the bedrooms of each member of the Addams family in order to find one item from each.

Gameplay

The game is a side-scrolling platform game that plays in a very similar way to the previous Addams Family game. The player can choose which level to attempt by entering whichever door they choose in the Addams house.

Ports
The NES version is not a direct port of the SNES version. The NES version was based on the previous Addams Family game released for Super NES, Mega Drive and Amiga, showing the same levels, enemies, items and gameplay but with Pugsley as main character instead of Gomez.

The NES version lacks the freezer and crypt levels (they were reduced to the boss fights only) and the rest of the levels are shorter. It also lacks any in-game music. The NES version also omits the two weapons from the SNES (swords and golf balls). It does allow the player to obtain a password whenever they paused the game, whereas the SNES Addams Family only displays passwords after each boss was defeated.

The Game Boy version is a trimmed down port of the NES version. The stove level was completely removed (defeating the snowman boss would award Pugsley a heart like the other versions, but would also free Granny) as well as the big bird boss (Pugsley would start the game with the extra heart already in his possession). The final level was also removed, as entering the final door would send Pugsley directly to the final boss fight. Thing's hint boxes were also removed from this version.

Reception

A major source of criticism for the SNES version was the lack of a password feature, despite the game being very difficult. A password feature is present on both the NES and Game Boy versions. Super Play Magazine UK praised the graphics as they were more colourful than in the previous title. Review scores for the SNES version are generally higher than for either the NES or Game Boy versions.

Total!, in 1995, ranked Pugsley's Scavenger Hunt the 80th best all-time SNES game.

References 

1992 video games
The Addams Family video games
Game Boy games
Nintendo Entertainment System games
Platform games
Side-scrolling video games
Super Nintendo Entertainment System games
Video games about children
Video games based on animated television series
Ocean Software games
Video games developed in the United Kingdom